Revolution is the fourth solo studio album by Little Steven, released in 1989 by RCA Records. His backing band, the Disciples of Soul, were gone in all but name (although former Disciple/Young Rascals drummer Dino Danelli did the album art), and the music was largely electronic with a rock-soul-funk sound.

In 2019, the album was remastered for release as part of Van Zandt's career-spanning box set Rock N Roll Rebel: The Early Work. The digital deluxe edition of the album was released on November 15, 2019, containing two bonus tracks.

Track listing
All songs written and arranged by Little Steven.

 "Where Do We Go From Here?" - 5:53
 "Revolution" - 5:25
 "Education" - 4:39
 "Balance" - 5:16
 "Love and Forgiveness" - 4:48
 "Newspeak" - 5:21
 "Sexy" - 4:03
 "Leonard Peltier" - 3:45
 "Liberation Theology" - 4:49
 "Discipline" - 6:16

2019 digital deluxe edition bonus tracks
 "Revolution (Naked City Mix)" (UK 12" single - 1989) - 9:46
 "Revolution (Naked City Mix Part 2 - Maceo's Thang)" (UK 12" single - 1989) - 5:44

Personnel
Credits are adapted from the album liner notes.

 Little Steven – vocals, guitar, drum programming
 Mark Alexander – MIDI programming, keyboards, background vocals 
 Leslie Ming – drums, percussion, background vocals
 Warren McRae – bass, background vocals 
 Craig Derry – background vocals
 Will Downing – background vocals
 Danny Madden – background vocals
 Mark Ladford – background vocals
 David Beal – percussion on "Where Do We Go From Here?"
Technical
 Little Steven – producer
 Mark Alexander – production assistance
 Warren McRae – production assistance
 David McNair – engineer, mixing
 Tom Lord-Alge – mixing on "Balance" and "Love and Forgiveness" 
 Joe Perrera – assistant mixing engineer
 Bob Ludwig – mastering
 Dino Danelli – art director, designer, artist
 Veronica Sim – photography

Charts

Album

Singles

"Love and Forgiveness" and "Leonard Peltier" were also released as singles, however, they did not chart.

References

1989 albums
Steven Van Zandt albums
Albums produced by Steven Van Zandt